Sigulda is a town in the Vidzeme region of Latvia,  from the capital city Riga.

Overview
Sigulda is on a picturesque stretch of the primeval Gauja river valley. Because of the reddish Devonian sandstone which forms steep rocks and caves on both banks of the river, Sigulda has been called the "Switzerland of Vidzeme".

After the restoration of Latvian independence in 1991, an emphasis was placed on conserving Sigulda's public monuments and parks as well as improving the town's tourist sector. Supported by the town council, a traditional Opera Festival takes place in an open-air music hall in the castle ruins each summer. A Town Festival is celebrated in May when cherry trees blossom, while Sigulda is known for the colors of its trees in autumn. Sports such as skiing, bobsledding, and the luge are popular in wintertime and bungee jumping is practiced during the rest of the year.

The Gutmanis Cave lies halfway between Sigulda Castle and Turaida Castle and has a small stream flowing from it. The cave still bears inscriptions from as early as the 17th century; drinking the water is supposed to be healthy and is said to increase one's lifespan. From the cave it is possible to climb into the hills and take the cable car over the river valley.

The town's population has been growing every year since 2000. 86% of the population is Latvian, 9% Russian, 3% Belarusian, 2% others. In 2007 Sigulda celebrated its 800th anniversary.

Points of interest
Aerodium Latvia
Gauja National Park
Gutmanis Cave
Krimulda Castle
Sigulda bobsleigh, luge, and skeleton track
Sigulda Castle
Sigulda Medieval Castle
Turaida Castle

Twin towns — sister cities

Sigulda is a member of the Douzelage, a town twinning association of towns across the European Union. This active town twinning began in 1991 and there are regular events, such as a produce market from each of the other countries and festivals. As of 2019, its members are:

 Agros, Cyprus
 Altea, Spain
 Asikkala, Finland
 Bad Kötzting, Germany
 Bellagio, Italy
 Bundoran, Ireland
 Chojna, Poland
 Granville, France
 Holstebro, Denmark
 Houffalize, Belgium
 Judenburg, Austria
 Kőszeg, Hungary
 Marsaskala, Malta
 Meerssen, Netherlands
 Niederanven, Luxembourg
 Oxelösund, Sweden
 Preveza, Greece
 Rokiškis, Lithuania
 Rovinj, Croatia
 Sesimbra, Portugal
 Sherborne, England, United Kingdom
 Siret, Romania
 Škofja Loka, Slovenia
 Sušice, Czech Republic
 Tryavna, Bulgaria
 Türi, Estonia
 Zvolen, Slovakia

Other twinnings

 Angus, Scotland, United Kingdom
 Birštonas, Lithuania
 Chiatura, Georgia
 Chocz, Poland
 Falköping, Sweden
 Keila, Estonia
 Stuhr, Germany
 Vesthimmerland, Denmark

Notable people
Milda Lauberte, chess player
Sandis Ozoliņš, ice hockey player
Andris Šics, luger
Juris Šics luger

References

External links

Tourist information office of Sigulda

 
Towns in Latvia
Ski areas and resorts in Latvia
1928 establishments in Latvia
Populated places established in 1928
Kreis Riga